Kim Yu-yeon may refer to:

Kim Yu-yeon (curator) (born 1956), South Korean curator
Kim Yoo-yeon (born 1982), South Korean sport shooter
Kim Yu-yeon (swimmer) (born 1991), South Korean swimmer